Lott Warren (October 30, 1797 – June 17, 1861) was a United States representative from Georgia.  He was born in Burke County, Georgia near Augusta, Georgia. He attended the common schools and then moved to Dublin, Georgia in 1816. He served as a second lieutenant of Volunteers in the expedition against the Seminoles in 1818. He studied law and was admitted to the bar in 1821 and commenced practice in Dublin, Georgia. He was also a regularly ordained Baptist minister, but never filled a definite charge.

Warren moved to Marion, Georgia, in 1825 and was elected a major of the state militia in 1823. He served as a member of the Georgia House of Representatives in 1824 and 1831. He also served in the Georgia Senate in 1830. He was solicitor general and judge of the southern circuit of Georgia 1831–1834. He moved to Americus, Georgia in 1836 and was elected as a Whig to the 26th and 27th Congresses (March 4, 1839 - March 3, 1843). He was not a candidate for renomination in 1842. He moved to Albany, Georgia in 1842 and was judge of the superior court of Georgia 1843–1852. He resumed the practice of his of law and died in Albany, Georgia, in 1861 and was buried in Riverside Cemetery.

References

1797 births
1861 deaths
People from Burke County, Georgia
Georgia (U.S. state) lawyers
Georgia (U.S. state) state court judges
Members of the Georgia House of Representatives
Georgia (U.S. state) state senators
American people of the Seminole Wars
Whig Party members of the United States House of Representatives from Georgia (U.S. state)
19th-century American politicians
People from Dublin, Georgia
People from Americus, Georgia
American slave owners
19th-century American judges
19th-century American lawyers